The First Strike Ration (FSR) is a compact assault United States military ration. It is designed to be consumed on the move during the first 72 hours of conflict. It was created by the United States Army Soldier Systems Center in Natick, Massachusetts. The U.S. Army said the FSR substantially reduces weight and load and is intended to enhance a consumer's physical performance, mental acuity, and mobility.

Features 

The FSR is designed to provide mobile soldiers with a variety of foods that are lightweight, calorically dense, familiar, and which are more "easy to consume" than intermediate moisture foods.

 Enhanced mobility – components are described as "familiar, performance-enhancing, eat-out-of-hand" foods that require little or no preparation by the soldier. The beverages are reconstituted (CamelBak compatible) and consumed right out of the pouch. No water is needed for food preparation, only for the beverage mix. The food takes the form of pocket sandwiches to be eaten by hand.
 Lightweight – when compared to three Meals, Ready-to-Eat, the FSR reduces the weight and volume of one day's subsistence by approximately 50%.
The FSR has nine meals per shipping container consisting of three each of three different menus up through 2010. Since 2011 there are 9 different meal combinations per shipping container.
 Meals – Each pouch contains items for a breakfast, lunch, and a dinner.  Although there is no requirement to consume the items in any specific order.

A current Menu 1 ration contains:

Filled French Toast
Bacon Cheddar Breakfast Sandwich
Pepperoni Pocket Sandwich
Jalapeno Cheese Spread
Wheat Snack Bread
Dessert Bar, Peanut Butter
First Strike Bar (HOOAH! Bar)
Beef Snack, Teriyaki
Beef Snack, BBQ
Snack, Pretzels
Zapplesauce, Cinnamon
Nut Fruit Mix, Type III
Chocolate Protein Drink Mix
Beverage Base Powder
Caffeine Gum
Accessory Package

References

External links 
 First Strike Rations Menu
 First Strike Ration information at MREInfo.com

Military food of the United States